Ørnen (Danish: the Eagle) is a common Danish and Norwegian ship's name, including:

 HDMS Ørnen (1694) Danish frigate 1694–1715
 HDMS Ørnen (1775) Danish Royal schooner 1775–1791
 HDMS Hvide Ørn (1798) (White Eagle) Danish light frigate 1798-1799
 HDMS Ørnen (1800) Danish naval schooner 1800-07
 HDMS Ørnen (1842) Danish naval brig 1842–1871
 HDMS Ørnen (1880) Danish naval brig 1880–1906
 HDMS Ørnen (1934) Danish torpedo boat 1934–1941
 Ørnen (1909) Danish passenger ferry

Other 
 Ørnen, a Danish TV series, known as The Eagle: A Crime Odyssey in English speaking countries